"The Drover's Boy" is a song by Ted Egan, copyright 1993 by Ted Egan Enterprises.

Songs on the album (all composed by Ted Egan):

Book
Ted wrote a book based on the story of the song; The Drover's Boy (2000) 

The jacket description reads:
"Based on a song of the same name and set in the 1920s, The Drover's Boy recalls the time when it was illegal for Caucasians and Aborigines to marry, and the death of an Aborigine went unnoticed by the white community. This popular and moving Australian folk song comes from a true story about a Caucasian drover (the Australian name for a cowboy or sheep herder) who is forced to pass off his Aboriginal wife as his "drover's boy". Ted Egan wrote this song as a tribute to the Aboriginal stockwomen, in the hope that one day their enormous contribution to the Australian pastoral industry might be recognized and honored. Ages 11+."

Compilations and cover versions
Amanda Palmer performed The Drover's Boy on her 2020 Album Forty Five Degrees Bushfire Charity Flash Record.
 The Drover's Boy (Ted Egan singer) was one track on this compilation album.
John Williamson performed The Drover's Boy on his 1989 album Warragul. This track won for him the 'Heritage Award' at the Country Music Awards of Australia in 1990.

Bibliography
The Drover's Boy has been collected in:

 (text by Peter Forrest ; foreword by Dame Mary Durack; musical notation by Erik Kowarski ; cover illustration, Bill Gwydir on the Birdsville Track, by Robert Wettenhall, 1983.)
and inspired a series of paintings:
 Bob Marchant was winner of Sir John Sulman Prize in 1988 and joint winner in 1987.
and a stage production:

Movie
Ted saw a potential movie in the story of The Drover's Boy and commissioned Cinevest Limited to find potential backers. A prospectus was issued in 1995
The funds raised by Cinevest and Ted Egan personally, after pre-production costs were sufficient to capture extensive footage of outback cattle movements on high quality film, but insufficient to guarantee completion of the full-length movie, so the project was abandoned.

References

External links
 Ted Egan singing the song on youtube

John Williamson (singer) songs
1993 songs